Butyricicoccus pullicaecorum  is an anaerobic and butyrate-producing bacterium from the genus of Butyricicoccus which has been isolated from the cecal content of a broiler chicken in Maldegem in Belgium.

References 

Clostridiaceae
Bacteria described in 2008